Leptolalax kecil is a species of megophryid frogs found in the Cameron Highlands of Peninsular Malaysia. It is only known from its type locality, but it is expected to have a wider distribution in the Cameron Highlands. This species may have been erroneously identified as Leptolalax gracilis.

Description
Leptolalax kecil is a small-sized toad, similar in size to L. pluvialis. Male Leptolalax kecil call at night on the ground near streams. The call differs from those known in other species of Leptolalax: male emits only one short, clearly pulsed call at a time, in contrast to long, successive notes of other species.

Conservation
The species has not been assessed by the IUCN, but habitat loss due logging and agriculture is occurring near the type locality.

References

External links
Amphibian and Reptiles of Peninsular Malaysia - Leptolalax kecil

kecil
Endemic fauna of Malaysia
Amphibians of Malaysia
Frogs of Asia
Amphibians described in 2009
Taxa named by Masafumi Matsui